Claudio Sulser (born 8 October 1955 in Lugano, Switzerland) is a retired football striker.

During his club career, Sulser played for FC Mendrisio-Stabio, FC Vevey Sports 05, Grasshoppers Zürich and FC Lugano. He also represented the Swiss national team.

He was the second chairman of the FIFA Ethics Committee between 2010 and 2012 and therefore was the head of the investigation into the voting scandal haunting the 2018 and 2022 World Cup selections, until the committee was reformed in 2012, being led by jurists from then on.

Honours

Player

Club

Grasshoppers Zürich
 Swiss Super League - 1977–78, 1981–82, 1982–83, 1983–84
 Swiss Cup - 1982–83

Individual
 Swiss Footballer of the Year - 1982
 Swiss Super League Top Scorer - 1979/80, 1981/82
 UEFA European Cup Top Scorer - 1978–79

External links
 
 
 FIFA Ethics article

1955 births
Living people
Swiss men's footballers
Switzerland international footballers
Association football forwards
Grasshopper Club Zürich players
UEFA Champions League top scorers
Sportspeople from Lugano